Samba is a lively dance of Afro-Brazilian origin in 2/4(2 by 4) time danced to samba music.             

 
The term "samba" originally referred to any of several Latin duet dances with origins from the Congo and Angola. Today Samba is the most prevalent dance form in Brazil, and reaches the height of its importance during the festival of Carnaval. There is actually a set of dances, rather than a single dance, that define the Samba dancing scene in Brazil; however, no one dance can be claimed with certainty as the "original" Samba style. Besides Brazilian Samba, a major style of Samba is ballroom Samba, which differs significantly.

Etymology 

There are many theories about the origin of the word "samba".

One of the first references to "samba" was in Pernambuco magazine's O Carapuceiro, in February 1838. Father Miguel Lopes Gama of Sacramento wrote an article arguing against what he called "the samba d'almocreve", which was a type of dance drama popular with black people of that time.

According to Hiram Araújo da Costa, over the centuries, the festival of dances of slaves in Bahia were called samba. Samba de Roda was the main form of circle dance, provenient from the Candomblé Afro-Brazilian Tradition.

During the mid-19th century, the word referred to several types of music made by enslaved Africans. Samba further developed specific characteristics in each Brazilian state, not only due to the diversity of tribes of African immigrants, but also because of the distinctive cultures each region embodied. Some of these popular dances were known as Candomblé, Catêrêtê, Caxambú, Choradinho, Côco-inchádo, Cocumbí, Córta-jáca, Cururú, Furrundú.

Styles

Samba no pé

Samba no pé (literally, "samba in the foot") is a solo dance that is commonly danced impromptu when samba music is played. The basic movement involves a straight body and a bending of one knee at a time. The feet move very slightly - only a few inches at a time. The rhythm is 2/4, with 3 steps per measure. It can be thought of as a step-ball-change. It can be described calling it and-a-one, and-a-two, then back to one. The basic movement is the same to either side, where one foot moves to the outside lifting up just before the first beat (i.e. the right leg moves slightly to the right) and leg is kept as straight as a pole. The other foot moves slightly towards the front, and closer to the first foot. The second leg bends lightly at the knee so that the left side of the hip lowers and the right side appears to move higher. The weight is shifted to this inside foot briefly for the next "and-a", then shifted back to the outside foot on the "two", and the same series of actions is repeated towards the other side.

The dance simply follows the beat of the music and can go from average pace to very fast. Men dance with the whole foot on the ground while women, often wearing heels, dance just on the balls of the foot. Professionals may change the steps slightly, taking 4 steps per measure instead of 3, and often add various arm movements depending on the mood of the music.

There are also regional forms of the dance in Brazil where the essential steps are the same, but because of a change in the accent of the music people will dance similar movements to the slightly changed accents. For instance, in Bahia the girls tend to dance tilting their legs towards the outside instead of keeping their knees close to each other as in Rio de Janeiro.

This is the type of Samba one sees in the Brazilian Carnival parades and in other Samba carnivals over the world. This is also one of the most common type of samba dancing in Brazil.

Samba de Gafieira

Samba de Gafieira is a partner dance considerably different from the Ballroom Samba. It appeared in the 1940s and it gets its name from the gafieira, popular urban nightclubs of Rio de Janeiro at that time.

The dance derived from the Maxixe and followed the arrival of the Choro (another samba musical style). It left most of the Maxixe's Polka elements behind but maintained the entwined leg movements of the Argentine tango, although adopting a more relaxed posture than the latter. Many see this form of Samba as a combination of Waltz and Tango. Several Brazilian dance studios use elements and techniques from these two dances to teach Samba de Gafieira steps and dance routines.

Samba Pagode
Samba Pagode is a Samba partner dance that resembles the Samba de Gafieira but tends to be more intimate. The literal meaning of the Portuguese word "pagode" translates to "fun" or "merrymaking". The word is also utilized to refer to an informal gathering of samba dancers along with their accompanying music.

A key feature of Samba Pagode is its rhythmic texture created with a variety of beats. It became a dance style after the appearance of the Pagode style of music, which originated in the Brazilian city of São Paulo. The pagode style utilizes  three specific percussion instruments:  the tanta, the repique-de-mao, and the pandeiro. All three instruments are played by hand, which lends to creating a softer, more intimate sound than the batucada Samba performed by many Samba schools in Brazil. Pagode-like events have dated back to the late 19th and early 20th centuries, with the emergence of urban Samba in Rio de Janeiro.

Samba Axé
Samba Axé is a solo dance that started in 1992 during the Brazilian Carnival season in Bahia when the Axé rhythm replaced the Lambada. For years it became the major type of dance for the North east of Brazil during the holiday months. The dance is completely choreographed and the movements tend to mimic the lyrics. It is very energetic and mixes elements of Samba no pé and aerobics and because of the lyrics, which are made for entertainment, the dance generally has some sort of ludic element.

Several Axé music groups such as "É o Tchan" have as part of their marketing strategy to always release a choreography together with every one of their songs; therefore, Samba Axé is an ever-changing genre with no set of steps, routines or basic step.

Samba-reggae
Samba-reggae is a mix of reggae beats created by Samba drums. It is found in popular songs by the artist Daniela Mercury, who introduced the rhythm to the world with songs like "Sol da Liberdade" "O Reggae E O Mar" and "Perola Negra". Samba Reggae is a popular samba style in Bahia, with many followers in various parts of Brazil.

Samba-reggae has birthed a style of African-influenced dance which has been obtained from the styles of Afro-Brazilian and candomble dance. Within social settings, samba-reggae dances are often performed in a follow-the-leader manner, with a small number of advanced dancers initiating steps in a line in front of the crowd, and then the whole crowd subsequently following along. The percussionists of samba-reggae often dance while playing their drums as well. The third- and fourth drummers, known as surdos perform short choreographies, utilizing mallets to emphasize sharp arm movements. The fundos (the first and second surdos at the lead) often take center stage to showcase elaborate, deft mallet lifts and throws, and also toss their drums high overhead.

Samba-rock
Samba-rock is a playful form of the samba that originates from São Paulo. It is a form of Latin nightclub dance.

One of Samba-rock's first dance instructors, Mestre Ataliba, describes the essence of the dance style. "Dance wise, samba rock is about relaxation and concentration, all at once... It blends the African 'ginga' (body flow from Capoeira), which is present at the feet and the hips, and the European reference of the ballroom etiquette. We can dance it to the sound of Rita Pavone, samba pagode, reggae, R&B. It really embraces every music culture".

Samba de roda 

("Samba of roda") is a traditional Afro-Brazilian dance performed originally as informal fun after a Candomblé ceremony, using the same percussion instruments used during the religious ceremony. The typical drum is the atabaque; drummers improvise variations and elaborations on common patterns, accompanied typically by singing and clapping as well as dancing.

The Samba de Roda is a celebratory event incorporating music, choreography and poetry.

The term "Samba" encompassed many different rhythms, tunes, drumming and dances of various periods and areas of the Brazilian territory. It appeared in the state of Bahia, more specifically in the region of Recôncavo in Brazil, during the 17th century.

Because all drumming and dance was generalized by Portuguese colonizers as "samba", it is difficult to attribute it to one distinct heritage. However, the most universally recognized cultural origin of Samba is Lundu, a rhythm that was brought to Brazil by the Bantu slaves from Africa. Lundu reveals, in a way, the amalgamation of black (slaves) and white (Portuguese) and indigenous cultures. When the African slaves where imported, it was named the "semba" and with the introduction of the Arabic Pandeiro (tambourine), brought into the Roda by the Portuguese, the "Samba" was molded into the form of dance it is now.

In the indigenous language, "samba" means roda de dança, or a circle to dance since the indigenous peoples danced in celebration on many occasions, such as the celebration of popular Catholic festivals, Amerindian or Afro-Brazilian religious ceremonies, but was also practiced at random.

All participants, including beginners, are invited to join the dance and observe as well as imitate. Usually, only the women dance after each other and they are surrounded by others dancing in a circle and clapping their hands. The choreography is often spontaneous and is based on movements of the feet, legs and hips. One of the most typical moves is the umbigada which is clear Bantu influence, where the dancer invites her successor into the circle's center.

The factor that frequently draws the attention of most people to the rhythm is the unusually-accented (syncopated) beat. The absent beat is the strongest characteristic of Samba prompting the listener to dance to fill the gap with her/his body movements. This syncopated rhythm is also an indication of Black resistance against cultural assimilation. The Samba of Roda in particular was considered an expression of freedom and identity of the underprivileged and became a means of liberation.

The Samba de Roda has significantly waned during the twentieth century due to economic decline and increased poverty in the region. The effects of mass media and competition from popular modern music have also devalued this tradition among the younger generation. Finally, the weakening of the Samba de Roda was heightened through the aging of practitioners and demise of those who made the musical instruments.

See also
Carioca (dance)
Samba school

References

External links
Origins & History of Samba 
Brazilian Music and Dance - SAMBA 

Brazilian dances
Samba